Sidhu Kanhu Birsa Polytechnic , also known as Keshiary Polytechnic,  is a government polytechnic located in Keshiary,  Paschim Medinipur district, West Bengal. This polytechnic is affiliated to the West Bengal State Council of Technical Education,  and recognised by AICTE, New Delhi.

About college

Sidhu Kanhu Birsa Polytechnic is under the West Bengal State Council of Technical Education board and All India Council for Technical Education approved. This polytechnic offers diploma courses in Electrical, and Civil Engineering. Semester examination held in December (odd semester) and in June (even semester) every year.

This institute offers diploma degree in the branches mentioned below:

Library & centers
In the college there is a library, study facility, language room, common room and seminar hall.

Admission procedure
Aspirants must appear for the JEXPO entrance test. Qualified students can select the institute by attending counseling. In JEXPO entrance test there are three subjects: Physics, Chemistry, Mathematics.

Transportation 
Bus service is available from Keshiary Bus Stand. Sidhu Kanhu Birsa Polytechnic is about 2 kilometers from Keshiary Bus Stand.

The nearest Railway stations from Keshiary are Belda and Kharagpur.

Kharagpur Railway Station is about 28 km from Keshiary.

Buses from Kharagpur to Keshiary are available all the day at an interval of 45 mins.

See also
List of institutions of higher education in West Bengal
Education in India
Education in West Bengal
All India Council for Technical Education

References

External links
https://www.facebook.com/Sidhukanhubirsapolytechnic/
http://www.jobsfordiploma.com/
Sidhu Kanhu Birsa Polytechnic
Official website WBSCTE

Universities and colleges in Paschim Medinipur district
Technical universities and colleges in West Bengal
Educational institutions established in 2009
2009 establishments in West Bengal